Hans Struzyna (born March 31, 1989) is an American rower. He competed in the men's eight event at the 2016 Summer Olympics, finishing in fourth place.

Struzyna graduated from the University of Washington in 2011 with a degree in Business.

References

External links
 

1989 births
Living people
American male rowers
Olympic rowers of the United States
Rowers at the 2016 Summer Olympics
Place of birth missing (living people)